Maximilian Schell (8 December 1930 – 1 February 2014) was an Austrian-born Swiss actor, who also wrote, directed and produced some of his own films. He won the Academy Award for Best Actor for the 1961 American film Judgment at Nuremberg, his second acting role in Hollywood. Born in Austria, his parents were involved in the arts and he grew up surrounded by performance and literature. While he was still a child, his family fled to Switzerland in 1938 when Austria was annexed by Nazi Germany, and they settled in Zurich. After World War II ended, Schell took up acting and directing full-time. He appeared in numerous German films, often anti-war, before moving to Hollywood.

Fluent in both English and German, Schell earned top billing in a number of Nazi-era themed films. Two earned him Oscar nominations: The Man in the Glass Booth (1975), for a character with two identities, and Julia (1977), portraying a member of a group resisting Nazism.

His range of portrayals included personalities as diverse as Venezuelan leader Simón Bolívar, Russian emperor Peter the Great, and physicist Albert Einstein. For his role as Vladimir Lenin in the television film Stalin (1992) he won the Golden Globe Award. Schell also performed in a number of stage plays, including a celebrated performance as Prince Hamlet.

Schell was an accomplished pianist and conductor, performing with Claudio Abbado and Leonard Bernstein, and with orchestras in Berlin and Vienna. His elder sister was the internationally noted actress Maria Schell; he produced the documentary tribute My Sister Maria in 2002.

Early life
Schell was born in Vienna, Austria, the son of Margarethe (née Noe von Nordberg), an actress who ran an acting school, and Hermann Ferdinand Schell, a Swiss poet, novelist, playwright and pharmacy owner. His parents were Roman Catholic.

Schell's father was never enthusiastic about young Maximilian becoming an actor like his mother, feeling that it could not lead to "real happiness". However, Schell was surrounded by acting in his early youth:

The Schell family fled from Vienna in 1938 to get "away from Hitler" after the Anschluss, when Austria was annexed by Nazi Germany. They resettled in Zurich, Switzerland.

In Zurich, Schell "grew up reading the classics", and when he was ten, wrote his first play. Schell recalls that as a child, growing up surrounded by the theatre, he took acting for granted and did not want to become an actor at first: "What I wanted was to become a painter, a musician, or a playwright," like his father.

Schell later attended the University of Zurich for a year, where he also played soccer and was on the rowing team, along with writing for newspapers as a part-time journalist for income. Following the end of World War II, he moved to Germany where he enrolled in the University of Munich and studied philosophy and art history. During breaks, he would sometimes return home to Zurich or stay at his family's farm in the country so he could write in seclusion:

Schell then returned to Zurich, where he served in the Swiss Army for a year, after which he attended the sixth form of University College School, London, for one year before re-entering the University of Zurich for another year, and later, the University of Basel for six months. During that period, he acted professionally in small parts, in both classical and modern plays, and decided that he would from then on devote his life to acting rather than pursue academic studies:

Schell began acting at the Basel Theatre.

His elder sister Maria Schell was also an actor, as were their siblings, Carl (1927–2019) and Immaculata "Immy" Schell (1935–1992).

Career
Schell's film debut was in the German anti-war film Kinder, Mütter und ein General (Children, Mothers, and a General, 1955). It was the story of five mothers who confronted a German general at the front line, after learning that their sons, some as young as 15, had been "slated to be cannon fodder on behalf of the Third Reich." The film co-starred Klaus Kinski as an officer, with Schell playing the part of an officer-deserter. The story, which according to one critic, "depicts the insanity of continuing to fight a war that is lost," would become a "trademark" for many of Schell's future roles: "Schell's sensitivity in his portrayal of a young deserter disillusioned with fighting became a trademark of his acting."

Schell subsequently acted in seven more films made in Europe before going to the U.S. Among those was The Plot to Assassinate Hitler (also 1955). Later in the same year he had a supporting role in Jackboot Mutiny, in which he plays "a sensitive philosopher", who uses ethics to privately debate the arguments for assassinating Hitler.

In 1958 Schell was invited to the United States to act in the Broadway play, "Interlock" by Ira Levin, in which Schell played the role of an aspiring concert pianist. He made his Hollywood debut in the World War II film, The Young Lions (1958), as the commanding German officer in another anti-war story, with Marlon Brando and Montgomery Clift. German film historian Robert C. Reimer writes that the film, directed by Edward Dmytryk, again drew on Schell's German characterisation to "portray young officers disillusioned with a war that no longer made sense."

In 1960, Schell returned to Germany and played the title role in William Shakespeare's Hamlet for German TV, a role that he would play on two more occasions in live theatre productions during his career. Along with Laurence Olivier, Schell is considered "one of the greatest Hamlets ever," according to one writer. Schell recalled that when he played Hamlet for the first time, "it was like falling in love with a woman. ... not until I acted the part of Hamlet did I have a moment when I knew I was in love with acting." Schell's performance of Hamlet was featured as one of the last episodes of the American comedy series Mystery Science Theater 3000 in 1999.

Judgment at Nuremberg (1961)

In 1959, Schell acted in the role of a defence attorney on a live TV production, Judgment at Nuremberg, a fictionalized re-creation of the Nuremberg War Trials, in an edition of Playhouse 90. His performance in the TV drama was considered so good that he and Werner Klemperer were among the only members of the original cast selected to play the same parts in the 1961 film version. He won the Academy Award for Best Actor, which was the first win for a German-speaking actor since World War II.

After winning the New York Film Critics award for his role, Schell recalled the pride he felt upon receiving a letter from his older sister Maria Schell, who was already an award-winning actress:

According to Reimer, Schell gave a "bravura performance," where he tried to defend his clients, Nazi judges, "by arguing that all Germans share a collective guilt" for what happened. Biographer James Curtis notes that Schell prepared for his part in the movie by "reading the entire forty-volume record of the Nuremberg trials." Author Barry Monush describes the impact of Schell's acting:

Producer-director Stanley Kramer assembled a star-studded ensemble cast which included Spencer Tracy and Burt Lancaster. They "worked for nominal wages out of a desire to see the film made and for the opportunity to appear in it," notes film historian George McManus. Actor William Shatner remembers that, prior to the actual filming, "we understood the importance of the film we were making." It was nominated for eleven Academy Awards, winning two. In 2011, Schell appeared at a 50th anniversary tribute to the film and his Oscar win, held in Los Angeles at the Academy of Motion Picture Arts and Sciences, where he spoke about his career and the film.

Independent filmmaker
Beginning in 1968 Schell began writing, producing, directing and acting in a number of his own films: Among those were The Castle (1968), a German film based on the novel by Franz Kafka, about a man trapped in a bureaucratic nightmare. Soon after he made Erste Liebe (First Love) (1970), based on a novel by Ivan Turgenev. The film was nominated for the Academy Award for Best Foreign Language Film.

Schell's next film, The Pedestrian (1974), is about a German tycoon "haunted by his Nazi past".  In this film, notes one critic, "Schell probes the conscience and guilt in terms of the individual and of society, reaching to the universal heart of responsibility and moral inertia." It was nominated for the Best Foreign Language Film Oscar and was a "great and commercial success in Germany," notes Roger Ebert.

Schell then produced, directed and acted as a supporting character in End of the Game (1975), a German crime thriller starring Jon Voight and Jacqueline Bisset. A few years later he co-wrote and directed the Austrian film Tales from the Vienna Woods (1979). He had previously (1977) directed a stage production of the original play of that name by Ödön von Horváth at the National Theatre in London.

World War II themes

During his career, as one of the few German-speaking actors working in English-language films, Schell was top billed in a number of Nazi-era themed films, including Counterpoint (1968), The Odessa File (1974), The Man in the Glass Booth (1975), A Bridge Too Far (1977), Cross of Iron (1977)  and Julia (1977). For the latter film, directed by Fred Zinnemann, Schell was again nominated for an Oscar for his supporting role as an anti-Nazi activist.

In a number of films Schell played the role of a Jewish character: as Otto Frank, Anne Frank's father, in The Diary of Anne Frank (1980); as the modern Zionist father in The Chosen (1981); in 1996, he played an Auschwitz survivor in Through Roses, a German film, written and directed by Jürgen Flimm; and in Left Luggage (1998) he played the father of a Jewish family.

In The Man in the Glass Booth (1975), adapted from the stage play by Robert Shaw, Schell played both a Nazi officer and a Jewish Holocaust survivor, in a character with a double identity. Roger Ebert  describes the main character, Albert Goldman, as "mad, and immensely complicated, and he is hidden in a maze of identities so thick that no one knows for sure who he really is." Schell, who at that period in his career saw himself primarily as a director, felt compelled to accept the part when it was offered to him:

Schell's acting in the film has been compared favorably to his other leading roles, with film historian Annette Insdorf writing, "Maximilian Schell is even more compelling as the quick-tempered, quicksilver Goldman than in his previous Holocaust-related roles, including Judgment at Nuremberg and The Condemned of Altona". She gives a number of examples of Schell's acting intensity, including the courtroom scenes, where Schell's character, after supposedly being exposed as a German officer, "attacks Jewish meekness" in his defense, and "boasts that the Jews were sheep who didn't believe what was happening." The film eventually suggests that Schell's character is in fact a Jew, but one whose sanity has been compromised by "survivor guilt." Schell was nominated for the Academy Award for Best Actor and the Golden Globe Award for Best Actor for his performance.

Character actor

To avoid being typecast, Schell also played more diverse characters in numerous films throughout his career: he played a museum treasure thief in Topkapi (1964); the eponymous Venezuelan revolutionary in Simón Bolívar (1969); a 19th-century ship captain in  Krakatoa, East of Java (1969); a Captain Nemo-esque scientist/starship commander in the science fiction film,  The Black Hole (1979); the Russian emperor in the television miniseries, Peter the Great (1986), opposite Laurence Olivier, Vanessa Redgrave and Trevor Howard, which won an Emmy Award; a comedy role with Marlon Brando in The Freshman (1990); Reese Witherspoon's surrogate grandfather in A Far Off Place; a treacherous Cardinal in  John Carpenter's Vampires (1998); as Frederick the Great in a TV film, Young Catherine (1991); as Vladimir Lenin in the TV series, Stalin (1992), for which he won the Golden Globe Award; a Russian KGB colonel in Candles in the Dark (1993); the Pharaoh in Abraham (1994); and Tea Leoni's father in the science fiction thriller, Deep Impact (1998).

From the 1990s until late in his career, Schell appeared in many German-language made-for-TV films, such as the 2003 film Alles Glück dieser Erde (All the Luck in the World) opposite Uschi Glas and in the television miniseries  (2004), which was based on Henning Mankell's novel The Return of the Dancing Master. In 2006 he appeared in the stage play of Arthur Miller's Resurrection Blues, directed by Robert Altman, which played in London at the Old Vic. In 2007, he played the role of Albert Einstein on the German television series Giganten (Giants), which enacted the lives of people important in German history.

Documentaries
Schell also served as a writer, producer and director for a variety of films, including the problematic documentary film Marlene (1984), with the unwilling participation of Marlene Dietrich. It was nominated for an Oscar, received the New York Film Critics Award and the German Film Award. Originally, Dietrich, then 83 years of age, had agreed to allow Schell to interview and film her in the privacy of her apartment. However, after he began filming, she changed her mind and refused to allow any actual video footage of her be shown. During a videotaped interview, Schell described the difficulties he had while making the film.

Schell creatively showed only silhouettes of her along with old film clips during their interview soundtrack. According to one review, "the true originality of the movie is the way it pursues the clash of temperament between interviewer and star. . . . he draws her out, taunting her into a fascinating display of egotism, lying and contentiousness."

Schell produced My Sister Maria in 2002, an intimate documentary about his sister, the noted actress Maria Schell. In the film, he chronicles her life, career and eventual diminished capacity due to illness. The film, made three years before her death, shows her mental and physical frailty, leading to her withdrawing from the world. In 2002, upon the completion of the film, they both received Bambi Awards, and were honored for their lifetime achievements and in recognition of the film.

Personal life

During the 1960s Schell had a three-year-long affair with Soraya Esfandiary-Bakhtiary, former second wife of the Reza Pahlavi, the final Shah of Iran. He also was rumored to have been engaged to the first African-American Supermodel Donyale Luna in the mid 1960s. In 1971 he had an affair with Neile Adams, according to her. In 1985, he met the Russian actress Natalya Andrejchenko, whom he married in June 1985; their daughter Nastassja was born in 1989. After 2002, separated from his wife (whom he divorced in 2005), Schell had a relationship with the Austrian art historian Elisabeth Michitsch. In 2008 he became romantically involved with German opera singer Iva Mihanovic, who was 48 years his junior. They eventually married on 20 August 2013.

Schell was a semi-professional pianist for much of his life. He had a piano when he lived in Munich and said that he would play for hours at a time for his own pleasure and to help him relax: "I find I need to rest. An actor must have pauses in between work, to renew himself, to read, to walk, to chop wood."

Conductor Leonard Bernstein claimed that Schell was a "remarkably good pianist." In 1982 on a program filmed for the U.S. television network PBS, Schell read from Beethoven's letters to the audience before Bernstein conducted the Vienna Philharmonic playing Beethoven symphonies.

In 1983, he and Bernstein co-hosted an 11-part TV series, Bernstein/Beethoven, featuring nine live symphonies, along with discussions between Bernstein and Schell about Beethoven's works.

On other occasions, Schell worked with Italian conductor Claudio Abbado and the Berlin Philharmonic, which included a performance in Chicago of Igor Stravinsky's Oedipus Rex and another in Jerusalem of Arnold Schoenberg's A Survivor from Warsaw. Schell also produced and directed a number of live operas, including Richard Wagner's Lohengrin for the Los Angeles Opera. He worked on the film project Beethoven's Fidelio, with Plácido Domingo and Kent Nagano.

Schell was a guest professor at the University of Southern California and was awarded an Honorary Doctorate from Spertus Institute for Jewish Learning and Leadership in Chicago.

Death
Schell died at the age of 83 on 1 February 2014, in Innsbruck, Austria, after a "sudden and serious illness". The German television news service Tagesschau reported that he had been receiving treatment for pneumonia.
His funeral was attended by Waltraud Haas, Christian Wolff, Karl Spiehs, Lawrence David Foldes, Elisabeth Endriss and Peter Kaiser. His grave is in Preitenegg/Carinthia (Austria) where the family home was located and where he and his sister lived the rest of their lives.

Filmography

Other awards and nominations
 1961: Academy Award (Best Actor), Judgment at Nuremberg
 1965: Ondas Award (Best Actor)
 1979: Golden Hugo Award for Tales from the Vienna Woods
 1980: German Film Award in Silver (program-filling feature film) for Tales from the Vienna Woods
 1984: German Film Award, Film Award for the role Morning in Alabama
 1985: Golden Globe nomination (documentary) for Marlene
 1985: Merit Cross 1st Class of the Federal Republic of Germany (Verdienstkreuz 1. Klasse)
 1985: Nominated for Academy Award for Documentary Feature for Marlene
 1990: Honorary Award of the German Film Award
 1992: Emmy Award nomination (Best Actor) in the TV film Miss Rose White
 1999: Method Fest for Lifetime Achievement
 1999: Platinum Romy for Lifetime Achievement
 2000: Satellite Award, Mary Pickford Award for Lifetime Achievement
 2002: Austrian Cross of Honour for Science and Art, 1st class
 2002: Bambi Award
 2006: Honorary Award of the Bavarian Film Awards for artistic mastery and humanism
 2008: Diva Award for Lifetime Achievement
 2009: Premio Roma
 2009: Bambi Award for Lifetime Achievement
 2011: Honorary Award of the Bernhard Wicki Film Award – The Bridge

See also
 List of German-speaking Academy Award winners and nominees

References

External links

 
 

1930 births
2014 deaths
20th-century Austrian male actors
20th-century Swiss male actors
21st-century Austrian male actors
21st-century Swiss male actors
Male actors from Zürich
Austrian emigrants to Switzerland
Austrian expatriates in West Germany
Austrian expatriates in Switzerland
Austrian male film actors
Austrian male television actors
Best Actor Academy Award winners
Best Drama Actor Golden Globe (film) winners
Best Supporting Actor Golden Globe (television) winners
Burials in Austria
Deaths from pneumonia in Austria
German Film Award winners
German-language film directors
Golden Orange Honorary Award winners
Male actors from Vienna
Officers Crosses of the Order of Merit of the Federal Republic of Germany
Opera directors
Recipients of the Austrian Cross of Honour for Science and Art, 1st class
Recipients of the Bambi (prize)
Shakespearean actors
Swiss expatriates in Austria
Swiss expatriates in West Germany
Swiss male film actors
Swiss male television actors
University of Basel alumni
University of Southern California faculty
University of Zurich alumni